Karel Gott (14 July 1939 – 1 October 2019) was a Czech singer, considered the most successful male singer in Czechoslovakia and the Czech Republic. He was voted the country's best male singer in the annual Český slavík (Czech Nightingale) national music  award 42 times, most recently in 2017.

He achieved considerable success in the German-speaking countries, where he was known as "the Golden Voice of Prague", winning the Goldene Stimmgabel award three times (1982, 1984, and 1995).

Over the course of his career he released over 100 albums and 100 compilation albums, and sold an estimated 50–100 million records worldwide, 23 million of them in the German-speaking market, and about 15 million in Czechoslovakia and its successor states, the Czech Republic and Slovakia.

Early life 
Gott was born in Pilsen in the Protectorate of Bohemia and Moravia (now Plzeň, Czech Republic), and lived in Prague from the age of six. Gott initially wanted to study art, but failed the exams at the Academy of Arts, Architecture and Design in Prague (UMPRUM), and so trained as an electrician. On completing his studies, he began working as an electrician, but also became interested in the Prague music scene, especially jazz. He experimented with playing the bass and the guitar, but eventually decided to focus on singing, studying privately. During the 1950s, he occasionally performed as an amateur singer and often participated in competitions.

Early career 
In 1958, he was an unsuccessful participant in an amateur singing contest in the Prague Slavonic House, entitled "Looking for New Talent", but succeeded in obtaining his first performance slots at the Vltava Prague Cafe that same year.

In 1960, he decided to become a professional singer. He studied opera at the Prague Conservatory under Konstantin Karenin, a student of the Russian bassist Feodor Chaliapin. Knowing of Gott's interest in current musical trends, Karenin instructed him not only in classical Italian pieces but also in popular music. Around this time Gott travelled abroad (to Poland) for the first time, with the Czechoslovak Radio Jazz Orchestra, conducted by Karel Krautgartner.

In 1962, Gott released his first single with Supraphon, a duet with the jazz singer, Vlasta Průchová entitled Až nám bude dvakrát tolik (When we are twice as old). That year Gott appeared in the first Zlatý slavík (Golden Nightingale) national poll, placing 49th with three votes. Shortly afterwards, in 1963, Gott left the conservatory to continue with private singing lessons until 1966.

In 1963 Gott was offered a place at the recently founded Semafor Theater, which was at the forefront of the emerging Czechoslovak pop music scene, his first significant experience of stage performance. In the same year, he released his first solo single, a Czech recording of Henry Mancini's Moon River, followed by his song Oči sněhem zaváté (Snowdrift Eyes), which became the year's best-selling record. Shortly afterwards, Gott received the first of forty-two Zlatý slavík awards, given to the most popular artist of the year.

Gott established the Apollo Theater in 1965, along with two colleagues from Semafor: Jiří and Ladislav Štaidl. At this point, he was already well known to the public, appearing in the programs Pilgrimage for Two and Evening Prayer while building a repertoire with his own orchestra. He began composing his own songs, and toured Czechoslovakia and abroad with the Apollo Theater. That year, he released his first album, Karel Gott Sings with Supraphon, followed by an English export album titled The Golden Voice of Prague (Artia-Supraphon).

In 1967, Gott performed at Midem, the music industry trade fair in Cannes, France, where the applause was measured during every concert. Gott's performance surprised observers by reaching a level of 54 (compared to 58 for Tom Jones). Following this event, Gott signed a contract with the Polydor/Deutsche Grammophon Gesellschaft record company, renewing it several times until it became a life contract in 1997. Between 1967 and 2000, Polydor released over 125 albums and 72 singles for Karel Gott in German-speaking countries. Gott represented Austria in the Eurovision Song Contest 1968 with the song Tausend Fenster, finishing in 13th place. In the same year, Gott spent six months performing nightly at the New Frontier Hotel and Casino in Las Vegas.

1970s

In the 1970s, Gott achieved domestic success and appeared regularly on television, including in a ten-part serial entitled Karel Gott in Slany. In Germany, one of his most successful markets, he celebrated his breakthrough in 1970 with the song Einmal um die ganze Welt and was a star in both West Germany and East Germany. He regularly appeared in television shows like the ZDF-Hitparade.

One of his best-known hits was the title music to the animated film series Maya the Honey Bee. He recorded the theme in German, later also in Slovak and Czech for the dubbed versions in those languages. On 3 May 1977, he was awarded the title of Merited Artist, and in the following year received the Golden Hat of Cologne, awarded annually to a prominent cultural or social figure. After the publication of Charter 77, a document criticising the government of the Czechoslovak Socialist Republic, Gott took part in the anti-charter movement, in support of the government. His debut LP in the Soviet Union, released in 1977 by Melodiya, sold over 4.5 million copies, and he remains popular in the former Soviet Union countries.

Karel Gott recorded a cover version of the song All by Myself called Kam tenkrát šel můj bratr Jan (Where Did My Brother Jan Go This Time), dedicated to Jan Palach, the student activist who killed himself by self-immolation as a protest against the Soviet occupation of Czechoslovakia in January 1969. The song was recorded in 1977 while Soviet troops were still present in the country.

Towards the end of the decade, Gott began to experiment with other genres outside popular music, including country music and classical compositions, and he appeared at the Fan Fair Country Music Festival in 1979, the first of five appearances.

1980s and farewell tour
The 1980s were marked by international success for Gott, including the filming of the musical In the Track of Bel Canto in Italy in 1981, with an accompanying German-Italian album, and a duet performance with Sofia Rotaru in the Soviet Union. In 1983, Gott was awarded the Gold Medal of Hermann Löns in Munich, Germany, for his role in the development of German traditional song. On 30 April 1985, he was awarded the title of National Artist for exceptional artistic contributions. In 1986, to mark 20 years with the company, he received Polydor's Golden Needle, previously only awarded to Leonard Bernstein and Herbert von Karajan. In March 1991 he was the first artist inducted into the Hall of Fame of the Academy of Popular Music, and he was awarded the Supraphon Diamond Record Award on 8 September 1992, in recognition of record sales of 13 million in Czechoslovakia.

In 1990, Gott announced the end of his career and arranged a long farewell tour. However, the success of the tour led him to retract his decision. In 1993, he established an artistic agency, GOJA, with František Janeček, which now produces Gott's records and manages his artistic activities.

Comeback and later career

In 1996, following renewed public interest in his career, Gott again won the Český slavík (Czech Nightingale), and won the accolade every year since, with the exception of 1998 and 2012. He remained popular in a number of countries and performed widely outside the Czech Republic. On 29 September 2000 he played a concert at Carnegie Hall in New York City.

In 2008, he appeared on Bushido's album Heavy Metal Payback, performing a duet called "Für immer jung", a cover of "Forever Young" by Alphaville.

In 2009 he was awarded a Distinguished Merit Medal by the Czech state.

His German lyricist from 2001 was Filip Albrecht, who wrote over 20 songs for him. In May 2014 Gott released his autobiography Zwischen zwei Welten (Between two worlds).

In May 2019, only months before he died, Gott released his last song and music video - a duet with his daughter Charlotte entitled "Srdce nehasnou" (Hearts don't fade). At the time of release, Gott's health issues were kept secret from the public, but after Gott died, songwriter Richard Krajčo said that he had been asked to write the duet in a very short time.

Personal life

He had two daughters (Dominika and Lucie) from different former relationships. He married his last wife, in January 2008 in Las Vegas, and they had two daughters, Charlotte (born in April 2006) and Nelly (born in May 2008).

During the 1990s, Gott began to focus on painting. The first exhibition of his paintings took place in 1992, at the Prague Christ Child Gallery, and his work was since exhibited in Berlin, Moscow, Munich, Cologne, Vienna, and Bratislava.

Health problems and death

In October 2015, Gott was diagnosed with cancer of the lymph nodes. On 18 March 2016, it was reported in the media that he had beaten cancer, but in September 2019, he developed acute leukemia, due to which he cancelled all upcoming appearances and started outpatient treatment. He died at around 11:30 pm on 1 October 2019 at his home in Bertramka, aged 80, with his family around him, and his death was reported the following morning. 

All major television stations in the Czech Republic featured breaking news announcements and commemorative programs in their schedules, and Czech Radio and Radio Impuls also adapted their scheduled broadcasts. At an extraordinary meeting on 2 October, the government approved a state funeral and declared the day of the funeral a national day of mourning. A day later, Prime Minister Andrej Babiš withdrew the proposal for a state funeral, saying that it should only be a funeral with state honours, as in the case of Otakar Motejl in 2010. At the presidential chateau in Lány, the Presidential flags were flown at half-mast as a sign of mourning, but according to the former proto-logger Jindřich Forejt, this violated the law on the use of state symbols of the Czech Republic.

A public commemorative ceremony was held at 8am on Friday, 11 October 2019, in Prague's Žofín Palace. Gott's fans travelled from around the Czech Republic and Germany and waited for several hours in a five-kilometre queue to the palace. The ceremony ended at midnight, by which time around 49,000 mourners had paid respects at his coffin. The funeral mass with state honours was held at Saint Vitus Cathedral on Saturday, 12 October, presided over by the Archbishop of Prague, Cardinal Dominik Duka. A day of national mourning was declared on the same day. The requiem guests included many famous Czech singers, actors, and sportsmen, as well as President Miloš Zeman and Prime Minister Babiš.

Discography

See also
Neznámy pár – duo with Marika Gombitová
Hrajme píseň – trio with Marika Gombitová and

References

External links
 
 Karel Gott discography
 German discography
 [ Karel Gott] at AllMusic
 
 

1939 births
2019 deaths
Eurovision Song Contest entrants for Austria
Eurovision Song Contest entrants of 1968
German-language singers
Czechoslovak male singers
Musicians from Plzeň
Musicians from Prague
Recipients of Medal of Merit (Czech Republic)
Deaths from cancer in the Czech Republic
Deaths from acute leukemia
20th-century Czech male singers
21st-century Czech male singers
Zlatý slavík winners
Recipients of the Order of the White Lion